Christopher Wayne Ralston (born ) is a former England international rugby union player. He represented the British and Irish Lions on their 1974 tour to South Africa and at the time played club rugby for Richmond F.C.

References

1944 births
Living people
English rugby union players
British & Irish Lions rugby union players from England
England international rugby union players
Middlesex County RFU players
Richmond F.C. players